Major General William Ruthven Smith (April 2, 1868 – July 15, 1941) was a career United States Army officer who commanded the 36th Division during its deployment in France during the final months of World War I. He later became Superintendent of the United States Military Academy at West Point, New York.

Early life
William Ruthven Smith was born on April 2, 1868, in Nashville, Tennessee, son of Robert McPhail and Lititia (Trimble) Smith. The younger Smith attended Vanderbilt University and was appointed to the United States Military Academy from his native state, graduating 10th out of 62 cadets in his class of 1892. His classmates included numerous men who would later attain general officer rank, such as Charles Pelot Summerall, Tracy Campbell Dickson, Frank W. Coe, Julian Robert Lindsey, James Ancil Shipton, Louis Chapin Covell, Preston Brown, George Blakely, Robert Mearns, Peter Weimer Davison, Howard Russell Hickok, Henry Howard Whitney, John E. Woodward, John McAuley Palmer and George Columbus Barnhardt.

Military career

Smith's early postings alternated between garrison service in field artillery and teaching at West Point as instructor of the separate subjects of chemistry, mathematics, ordnance, and gunnery. Made captain of the new Coast Artillery Corps in 1901, he was a student of the school of submarine defense and commanded Fort Monroe in 1908. In December 1901, Smith married Mary Prince Davis, the daughter of Brigadier General George B. Davis. They were the parents of two children who died young and two who lived to adulthood, Katherine Alexander Smith and Colonel William R. Smith Jr. In the years preceding World War I, Smith commanded anti-submarine technology schools and departments, in early 1917 stretching "the first submarine net put down in America, 2000 yards long, 84 feet at deepest point, extending from Fort Monroe to Fort Wool and closing entrance to Hampton Roads"

Promoted to colonel of the Coast Artillery Corps in May, 1917, the month following the American entry into World War I, Smith was made a brigadier general of the National Army and assigned to train the 62nd Field Artillery Brigade, part of the 37th Division (Ohio National Guard). After training that command for nine months at Camp Sheridan, Alabama, Smith traveled with the Guard unit to its embarkation for Europe, but was left on the docks when their ships departed on June 10, 1918, by order of the War Department.

Smith was given command of the 36th Division and promoted to major general of the National Army in the summer of 1918. After arriving in Brest, France, the 36th Division, Smith established a combat course for training at Bar-sur-Aube. In October, Smith led the 36th Division while with the 2nd Division it was attached to the French Fourth Army under Henri Gouraud on its push to the Aisne River. Smith remained in command of the division's demobilization in June 1919, seven months after the Armistice with Germany, when his National Army rank dissolved, his rank reverted again to colonel, U.S. Army. For his service during the war he was awarded the Army Distinguished Service Medal, the citation for which reads:

After promotion again to brigadier general, this time of the regular army, Smith served in several garrison commands in the Philippines, Fort Sam Houston, Fort Monroe again, and Honolulu, Hawaii, then returned to the United States Military Academy, this time to occupy the superintendent's billet, which he did from 1928 until 1932. During his tour as superintendent, Smith helped secure Stewart Field in nearby Newburgh, New York as a base for the Army Air Corps and USMA pilot training. Also during this period, his aide-de-camp was Floyd Lavinius Parks, who became a lieutenant general after World War II.

Civilian career 
After retirement, Smith returned to his native state of Tennessee, settling in Sewanee where he became superintendent of the local military academy (now St. Andrew's-Sewanee School) and served in that capacity until his death.

Death and legacy 
He died on July 15, 1941, in West Point, New York. Battery Smith at Fort Miles, Delaware (also called Battery 118) was named for him, armed with two 16-inch guns.

References

Bibliography

External links

|-

United States Military Academy alumni
United States Army Coast Artillery Corps personnel
United States Army Field Artillery Branch personnel
1868 births
1941 deaths
Superintendents of the United States Military Academy
People from Nashville, Tennessee
United States Army generals of World War I
People from Sewanee, Tennessee
Recipients of the Distinguished Service Medal (US Army)
United States Army generals
Vanderbilt University alumni
United States Military Academy faculty
Military personnel from Tennessee